is a passenger railway station in located in the city of Yao, Osaka Prefecture, Japan, operated by the private railway operator Kintetsu Railway. Onji is a small area just outside the center of Yao city. It takes about 30 minutes to get to downtown Osaka city (changing trains at Takayasu). Although part of Yao, Onji retains a small, almost village-like atmosphere.

Lines
Onji Station is served by the Osaka Line, and is located 13.3 rail kilometers from the starting point of the line at Ōsaka Uehommachi Station.

Station layout
The station consists of two elevated opposed side platforms with the station building underneath. The ticket gate is only one place. The length of the platform is 6 cars (120 meters)

Platforms

Adjacent stations

History
Onji Station opened on September 30, 1925.

Passenger statistics
In fiscal 2018, the station was used by an average of 5316 passengers daily.

Surrounding area

Tokoyogihime Shrine
 Onji River

See also
List of railway stations in Japan

References

External links

 Onji Station 

Railway stations in Japan opened in 1925
Railway stations in Osaka Prefecture
Yao, Osaka